Siddhakali  is market center in Chainpur Municipality in Sankhuwasabha District in the Kosi Zone of north-eastern Nepal. At the time of the 1991 Nepal census it had a population of 4743 people living in 880 individual households.

References

External links
UN map of the municipalities of Sankhuwasabha District

Populated places in Sankhuwasabha District